Badentarbat Bay, or Badentarbet Bay, is a bay in northern Scotland. The village of Achiltibuie overlooks it. Marian Leven painted scenes of the bay.

References

Ross and Cromarty
Bays of Highland (council area)